Dennis F. Roland (May 19, 1956 – January 1, 2008) was an American football coach.  He served as the head football coach at Olivet Nazarene University (1986–1990), Southwest Baptist University (1998–2000), Belhaven University (2001–2002), and Southeastern Louisiana University (2005–2006), compiling a career college football record of 47–80.  Roland died on January 1, 2008, from non-Hodgkin lymphoma.

Coaching career

Belhaven
Roland was the second head football coach at Belhaven College in Jackson, Mississippi and he held that position for two seasons, from 2001 until 2002.  His coaching record at Belhaven was 9–12.

Southeastern Louisiana
Roland's next position was as the 13th head football coach at Southeastern Louisiana University in Hammond, Louisiana and he held that position for two seasons, from 2005 until 2006.  His coaching record at Southeastern Louisiana was 6–15.

Death
Roland died on January 1, 2008, after suffering from non-Hodgkin lymphoma.

Personal life
Roland's son, Dennis Jr., played in the National Football League (NFL).

Head coaching record

College

High school

References

External links
 

1956 births
2008 deaths
Belhaven Blazers football coaches
Boston University Terriers football coaches
Kentucky Wildcats football coaches
Lees–McRae Bobcats football coaches
Liberty Flames football coaches
Olivet Nazarene Tigers football coaches
Southeastern Louisiana Lions and Lady Lions athletic directors
Southeastern Louisiana Lions football coaches
Southwest Baptist Bearcats football coaches
UTEP Miners football coaches
High school football coaches in Georgia (U.S. state)
Junior college football coaches in the United States
People from Polk County, Missouri
Deaths from non-Hodgkin lymphoma
20th-century Methodists